Esuprone is an experimental drug candidate being investigated as an antidepressant.  It acts as a monoamine oxidase A (MAO-A) inhibitor.

References

Antidepressants
Phenyl sulfonate ethers
Coumarins